Discwoman is a New York based collective, booking agency, and event platform representing and showcasing women and non-binary artists in the electronic music community. It was founded in 2014 by Frankie Decaiza Hutchinson, Emma Burgess-Olson (Umfang), and Christine McCharen-Tran. The collective addresses gender imbalance in club and festival lineups.

Artist roster 
Discwoman roster as of August 2022.

Events
Since its inaugural event at Bushwick, Brooklyn’s Bossa Nova Civic Club, Discwoman has presented showcases in Boston, Detroit's Movement Festival, Mexico City, Montreal, Philadelphia, Pittsburgh's VIA Festival, San Juan, Seattle's Decibel Festival, and Toronto. 

Co-founder Hutchinson, was involved in the 2017 campaign that repealed New York's anti-dancing Cabaret Law claiming it contained a disproportionate targeting of black and other minority communities. Hutchinson curated the Dweller Festival, promoting black underground talent in New York City.

References

External links 
 female:pressure report 03, 2015

2014 establishments
Organizations based in New York City
Feminist collectives
Feminist organizations in the United States
Electronic music organizations
Talent agencies
Women in New York City